S. Sriram was an Indian film producer from Tamil Nadu.

Biography
Sriram and Mani Ratnam established Aalayam Productions. He produced films like Thiruda Thiruda, Bombay and Aasai. Samurai was the last film which was produced by him.

Sriram died of cardiac arrest on 4 September 2019.

Selected filmography
 Chatriyan (1990)
 Dasarathan (1993)
 Thiruda Thiruda (1993)
 Bombay (1995)
 Aasai (1995)
 Samurai (2002)

References

Tamil film producers
2019 deaths
Film producers from Tamil Nadu
Year of birth missing